Cortes is a town and municipality located in the province and autonomous community of Navarre, northern Spain. It is being located right on the border with Aragon at the southernmost end of Navarre. Thus it is a southern outpost of the Historical Basque region although the area is unilingually Spanish.

References

External links
 CORTES in the Bernardo Estornés Lasa - Auñamendi Encyclopedia (Euskomedia Fundazioa) 

Municipalities in Navarre